Danda is a 1970 novel by Nigerian writer Nkem Nwankwo. It was published in the African Writers Series and by Open Humanities Press in the United States.

References 

1970 Nigerian novels
African Writers Series